Backstroke is the second studio album by Matthew Dear. It was released on Spectral Sound, a sub-label of Ghostly International, in 2004.

Critical reception

Andy Kellman of AllMusic gave the album 3.5 stars out of 5, saying, "Whatever its designation, Backstroke is a marked turn away from Leave Luck to Heaven, if scarcely a stylistic changeup." He added, "Several cuts will indeed serve adequately in the clubs, but the album as a whole is tailored for a more personal setting."

Track listing

References

External links
 

2004 albums
Matthew Dear albums
Ghostly International albums